Stand Off is an unincorporated community in southern Alberta, Canada within the Blood (Kainai) reserve. The people living in Stand Off and on the reserve are a part of the Blackfoot Nation of Canada and the United States. The Blood Tribe (Nation) has the largest landmass in all eleven Numbered Treaties in Canada, (1871–1921).

Demographics 
Stand Off recorded a population of 682 in the 1991 Census of Population conducted by Statistics Canada.

Notable people
Eugene Brave Rock (born c. 1978), an actor and stuntman, was born and raised in Stand Off

References 

Kainai Nation
Localities on Indian reserves in Alberta